Jakovleviola is a genus of beetles in the family Buprestidae, containing the following species:

 Jakovleviola oresibata Obenberger, 1924
 Jakovleviola strandi Obenberger, 1931

References

Buprestidae genera